In enzymology, a urea carboxylase is an enzyme that catalyzes the chemical reaction

ATP + urea + HCO3-  ADP + phosphate + urea-1-carboxylate

The 3 substrates of this enzyme are ATP, urea, and HCO3-, whereas its 3 products are ADP, phosphate, and urea-1-carboxylate (allophanate).

This enzyme belongs to the family of ligases, specifically those forming generic carbon-nitrogen bonds.  The systematic name of this enzyme class is urea:carbon-dioxide ligase (ADP-forming).   This enzyme participates in urea cycle and metabolism of amino groups.  It employs one cofactor, biotin.

See also
Allophanate hydrolase

References

 
 
 
 

EC 6.3.4
Biotin enzymes
Enzymes of unknown structure